The Kreis Avers forms, together with the Kreise of Domleschg, Rheinwald, Schams and Thusis the  ("district") of Hinterrhein of the Canton of Graubünden in Switzerland.  The seat of the sub-district office is in Avers.

Municipalities 
The Kreis ("sub-district") contains only one municipality:

Districts of Graubünden